This article provides you the list of major areas in and around the Indian city of Vellore, Tamil Nadu.

Neighbourhoods of Vellore
Areas within corporation limits as follows,
Thottapalayam
Gandhi Nagar
Sathuvachari
Thorapadi
Konavattam
Dharapadavedu
Shenbakkam
Kamaraj Nagar
Velpadi
Kosapettai
Perumugai
Toll gate
R n Palayam
Kaspa
Kahithapattrai
Perumal Nagar
Saidapet
Katpadi
Sainathapuram
Sankaranpalayam
Allapuram
CMC
Bagayam
Hazrath Makkaan 
Kangeyanallur
Vellore Fort
Green circule
New bustand
Old bustand
Adukkamparai
Pennathur
Kattuputhur
Pudur
Cholavaram
Amirthi
Arasampattu
Vallalar
Rangapuram
A.M.Puram (Alamelumangapuram)
Kazhinjur
Melmonavoor
Abdullapuram
Ariyur
Ussoor
sripuram
Palavansathu
Virupatchipuram
otteri
Chitteri

Suburban Vellore
 Ranipet
 Melvisharam
 Arcot
 Perumugai
 Rathnagiri
 Walajapet
 Gudiyatham
Pallikonda
 K. V. Kuppam
 Walajapet
 Arni
 Ambur
 VANIYAMBADI
 Pernambut
 Thirpathur
 Sholinghur
 Arakonam
 Ponnai
 NANDHIYALAM

Vellore
 
Vellore areas